Sundar Nagar (also spelled as Sundernagar) is a town and a municipal council in Mandi district in the Indian state of Himachal Pradesh. 
Formerly it was a princely state, known as Suket.

History 

Sunder Nagar was formerly the seat of princely state, known as Suket State.

Geo-climatic

Geography 

Sundar Nagar is located in Mandi, Himachal Pradesh, India. Its geographical coordinates are 31° 32' 0" North, 76° 53' 0" East and its original name (with diacritics) is Sundar Nagar.

Climate

Demography 

According to 2011 Census of India, the town's population stood at 24,344. Males constitute 53% of the population and females 47%. Sundar Nagar has an average literacy rate of 82%, higher than the national average of 59.5%. Male literacy is 85%, and Female literacy is 78%. In Sundar Nagar, 10% of the population is under 6 years of age.

Transport

Airport

The nearest airport is Bhuntar, near Kullu, which is about 82 km from the town.

A greenfield "Sundar Nagar International Airport", in Balh Valley, has been in planning since long. In 2013, the Government of Himachal Pradesh (GoHP) had sent a proposal to the Government of India (GoI) to construct this airport, which was esimated to cost Rs 700 crore at 2013 prices. The proposed airport  will have facilities for the wide-bodied larger aircraft. The techno-economic feasibility study of the identified site were already completed. The site, near Sunder Nagar, lies nearly in the center of the state. The state has three existing small airports at Kangra ( northwest), Kullu ( north) and Shimla ( southeast). A satellite survey of the site was conducted in 2018 and 698 acres land in the Ner Chowk area in Balh Valley was identified. In 2019, GoI had granted the approval for the airport, Airports Authority of India (AAI) was preparing a "detailed project report" (DPR) and GoHP was speeding up the land acquisition process.

Rail and roads 

The nearest broad-gauge railway station is Kiratpur Sahib which is about 105 km. Another broad-gauge railhead is at Pathankot, a distance of 210 km. From Pathankot, the narrow gauge railway connects to Joginder Nagar which is 80-km from Sundar Nagar.

Roads 

Sundar Nagar is situated on NH-154 (previously named NH21), 22 km from Mandi, and is well-connected by road to other places. Frequent bus services are available from Chandigarh, Delhi, Shimla, and Jammu for Sundar Nagar. The main bus stand is just above an open playing field, where the National Highway 21 continues along the left bank of river to Pandoh.

Public facilities

e-Governance Services Delivery Center 

A "Common Services Center" (CSC) or Department of Electronics and Information Technology of Government Of India is near New Manali Sweets & Bakers, HRTC Bus Stand on NH-21 Chandigarh-Mandi-Manali route.

Education 

School (Public and Private sectors)

King George Royal Public School, Sunder Nagar

St. Mary's High School, Sunder Nagar

D.A.V Public School,Sunder Nagar

Senior Secondary Boys School, Sunder Nagar

Government colleges:
 Government Polytechnic College, Sundernagar
 Government Sanskrit College, Sundernagar
 Jawaharlal Nehru Government Engineering College
 Maharaja Laxman Sen Memorial College
 Shri Lal Bahadur Shastri Government Medical College

Private colleges:
 Gayatri College of Education
 Himalayan College of Education
 Jagriti College
 Nandini College of Nursing
 Shri Sai School of Nursing
 Abhilashi Group of Institution 
 Sirda Group of Institution

References

Further reading 
 Hutchinson, J. & J. PH Vogel (1933). History of the punjab Hill States, Vol. I. 1st edition: Govt. Printing, Punjab, Lahore, 1933. Reprint 2000. Department of Language and Culture, Himachal Pradesh. Chapter VIII Suket State, pp. 340–372.
 History of Mandi

Cities and towns in Mandi district